The  is the tentative name for a planned underground heavy rail line which will run north-south between Tokyo Station and the Ariake district along Tokyo Bay. As of 25 November 2022, the projected completion date is in the 2040s.

Background 
Plans to construct a new subway line connecting Tokyo Station to the Tokyo Bay area had been in discussion since 2015 as Tokyo was undergoing preparations to host the 2020 Summer Olympics. However, on 25 November 2022, Tokyo governor Yuriko Koike revealed concrete plans to construct the subway line. Overall, the cost is expected to be  and is projected to open in the 2040s. It is currently unintended to be built as a standalone subway line. Rather, there are plans to run through services with the Rinkai Line and the Tsukuba Express along with a possible integration with the JR Haneda Airport Access Line. The rationale for building the line is due to the development of Tokyo Bay and the integration of leftover facilities from the 2020 Summer Olympics such as the athlete's village (which have since been remarketed as condominiums) and competitor venues. In addition, the island on which the former athlete's village is located, Harumi, remains without a railway connection. 

Construction is projected to begin in the 2030s. As of November 2022, the company in charge of construction has not been decided.

JR East 
Upon completion of the line, JR East plans to build a connection from the Haneda Airport Access Line to the Tokyo Rinkai Subway Line.

Rinkai Line 
A connection to the Rinkai Line from the southern terminus at Ariake is also being considered.

Tsukuba Express 
A northern extension of the Rinkai Subway Line to connect to the Tsukuba Express at Akihabara Station was also discussed by the Tokyo Metropolitan Government.

Stations 
All station names are provisional.

References

External links 

 Project summary (in Japanese)
 Official promotional material (in Japanese)

Proposed rail infrastructure in Japan